Ostermann is a German surname. Notable people with the surname include:

Clemens Ostermann (1984–2007), German voice actor and musician
Corny Ostermann (1911–1945), German jazz musician
Edward Albert Ostermann (1882–1969), United States Marine Corps general
Elard Ostermann (born 1968), German footballer
Friedrich Ostermann (1932–2018), German Roman Catholic titular bishop
Manfred Ostermann (born 1958), German politician
Max-Hellmuth Ostermann (1917–1942), German World War II flying ace
Tim Ostermann (born 1979), German politician
Willi Ostermann (1876–1936), German lyricist, composer and singer

See also

Alexander Ivanovich Ostermann-Tolstoy (1770–1857), Russian nobleman and soldier
Osterman

German-language surnames